This is a list of notable artists born in Northern Ireland.



A
Arthur Armstrong (1924–1996)
Array Collective (active 2016–present) –Northern Irish collective of artists and activists who won the 2021 Turner Prize

B
 James Bingham (1925–2009)
 Basil Blackshaw (1932–2016)
 Bogside Artists
 Alicia Boyle (1908–1997)
Terry Bradley (1965–)
 Muriel Brandt (1909–1981)
 Deborah Brown (1927– )
 John Byrne

C
Joseph W. Carey (1859–1937)
Thomas Carr (1909–1999) 
W. H. Conn (1895–1973)
William Conor (1881–1968)
William A. Coulter (1849–1936)
James Humbert Craig (1877–1944)

D
Colin Davidson (1968– )
Gerard Dillon (1916–1971)
Willie Doherty (1959– )
Keith Drury (artist) (1964– )
Rita Duffy (1959– )

F
T P Flanagan (1929–2011)
Hugh Frazer (1795–1865)
Rowel Friers (1920–1998)

G
William St. John Glenn "Bill Glenn" (1904–1974)
William Crampton Gore (1871–1946)

H
Siobhán Hapaska (1963– )
Sarah Cecilia Harrison (1863–1941)
Maurice Harron (1946– )
Jeremy Henderson (1952–2009)
Olive Henry (1902–1989)
Paul Henry (1876–1958)
Martin Heron (1965– )
Seán Hillen (1961– )
Mercy Hunter (1910–1989)

J
Oliver Jeffers (1977– )
Patrick J. Jones Sci-fi and fantasy artist

K
John Kindness (1951– )

L
Charles Lamb (1893–1964)
John Lavery (1856–1941)
John Long (1964– )
John Luke (1906–1975)

M
Gladys Maccabe (1918–2018)
George MacCann (1909–1967)
Kathleen Isabella Mackie (1899–1996)
Elizabeth Magill (1959– )
Cecil Maguire (1930–2020)
Jim Manley (1934– )
Padraig Marrinan (1906–1973)
Violet McAdoo (1896–1961)
Charles McAuley (1910–1999)
Samuel McCloy (1831–1904)
Norah McGuinness (1901–1980)
Frank McKelvey (1895–1974)
Cherith McKinstry (1928–2004)
F. E. McWilliam (1909–1989)
Colin Middleton (1910–1983)
Crawford Mitchell (1908–1976)
George C Morrison (1915–1993)
Albert Morrow (1863–1927)
George Morrow (1869–1955)
Jack Morrow (1872–1926)
Carolyn Mulholland  (1944– )

N 

 Paul Nietsche (1885–1950)

O
Daniel O'Neill (1920–1974)
Dennis H. Osborne (1919–2016)
Jean Osborne (1926–1965)

P
Charles Peers (1875–1944)
Raymond Piper (1923–2007)
Rosamond Praeger (1867–1954)

R
Clifford Rainey (1948– )
Maria D. Robinson (1840–1920)
Markey Robinson (1918–1999)
George William Russell (1867–1935)

S
William Scott (1913–1989)
Paul Seawright (1965– )
Elizabeth Shaw (1920–1992)
Neil Shawcross (1940– )
Oliver Sheppard (1865–1941)
James Sleator (1889–1950)
Hamilton Sloan (1945– )
Victor Sloan MBE (1945– )
Andre Stitt (1958– )

T 

 Romeo Toogood (1902–1966)

W
James Ward (1851–1924)
Ross Wilson (1958– )

Y
John Butler Yeats (1839–1922)

References

 
Artists
Northern Ireland